Coregonus lavaretus is a species of freshwater whitefish, in the family Salmonidae. It is the type species of its genus Coregonus.

There are widely different concepts about the delimitation of the species Coregonus lavaretus and about the number of species in the genus Coregonus in general.

Lavaret
In a narrow sense, Coregonus lavaretus, or the lavaret, is considered to be endemic
to Lake Bourget and Lake d’Aiguebelette in the Rhône river basin in France, whereas it formerly also occurred in Lake Geneva. According to this view there is a great number of distinct whitefish species in lakes, rivers and brackish waters of Central and Northern Europe.

European whitefish (common whitefish)

In the broad sense, Coregonus lavaretus, referred to as the common whitefish or European whitefish, is widespread from central and northwest Europe to Siberia. Often called the C. lavaretus complex and considered as a superspecies, it encompasses many of the whitefish populations suggested by others to be locally restricted species (such as the British powan and the gwyniad or the Alpine gravenche, as well as distinct intralacustrine morphs and populations characterized by different feeding habits, gill raker numbers, growth patterns and migration behaviour. Genetic studies suggest that the whitefish diversity within this complex is mostly of post-glacial origin. The resource polymorphism represented by the feeding morphs has evolved repeatedly and independently within individual lakes, and similar morphs in different lakes are not closely related to each other.

Description
There is much variation among the European whitefish forms, but in general they have a tapered body, a slightly protruding upper jaw and a fleshy dorsal fin that is typical of the salmon family. The snout is short and tapered, a fact that distinguishes this species from the two other North European Coregonus species, vendace (Coregonus albula) and the introduced peled (Coregonus peled). The former has a protuberant lower jaw while in the latter, the jaws are equal in length. The back is bluish green or brownish, the flanks silvery and the belly white. The fins are dark grey.

Biology
The European whitefish mostly feed on bottom-dwelling invertebrates or zooplankton. Larger fish also take insects off the surface of the water and eat fish fry. Breeding takes place in the autumn between September and November, largely depending on the water temperature. Different populations in the same sections of water may spawn at different times. Many populations in seas and lakes tend to make their way up-river to spawn, but others populations remain in lakes or the sea even when breeding.

References

lavaretus
Freshwater fish of Europe
Fish described in 1758
Taxa named by Carl Linnaeus